Lufthansa Cargo Flight 8460 was an international cargo flight that on 27 July 2010 crashed upon landing in Riyadh, Saudi Arabia. Both crew members, the only people on board, were injured but survived.

Accident 
Flight 8460 was an international scheduled cargo flight from Frankfurt, Germany, to Hong Kong via Riyadh, Saudi Arabia, and Sharjah, United Arab Emirates. The flight from Frankfurt to Riyadh was uneventful, and weather conditions at Riyadh were good, with sufficient visibility.

On arrival at King Khalid International Airport in Riyadh, the plane landed heavily, bounced repeatedly and eventually broke up on the runway. Both the captain and first officer were able to evacuate the plane using the emergency slide, but were injured. After the crash, a fire consumed the midsection of the aircraft before it was brought under control by the airport emergency services.

Aircraft 
The aircraft involved in the accident was a McDonnell Douglas MD-11 registered D-ALCQ, msn 48431, line number 534. The aircraft was delivered to Alitalia in 1993 as I-DUPB and converted to a cargo aircraft in 2004. At the time of the accident, D-ALCQ had completed 10,075 cycles and accumulated 73,200 hours flying time.

Investigation 
The General Authority of Civil Aviation opened an investigation into the accident. The final report found that the cause of the accident was that the airplane touched down too hard, which caused it to bounce on the runway. The crew did not recognize the bounce and reacted in a way that made the plane bounce even harder. The third and final touchdown was so hard that the aft fuselage ruptured and the plane crashed.

Before this accident, there were 29 other bounced or severe hard landings with MD-11 aircraft that caused substantial damage. A similar accident had occurred on FedEx Express Flight 80 in the previous year, where both crew members were killed in a bounced landing.

It was known that flight crews found MD-11 bounced landings difficult to detect. The final report made several recommendations to improve training, procedures and flight instruments to help crews to deal with bounced landings.

See also

 FedEx Express Flight 80 – an MD-11 that bounced and flipped on landing in 2009
 China Airlines Flight 642 – an MD-11 that landed hard and broke up in 1999
 FedEx Express Flight 14 – an MD-11 that bounced and flipped on landing in 1997
 List of accidents and incidents involving commercial aircraft

References

External links 
 Report with photographs of the accident aircraft (in Arabic)
 Final report  (Archive) – General Authority of Civil Aviation

2010 in Saudi Arabia
Accidents and incidents involving cargo aircraft
Aviation accidents and incidents in 2010
Accidents and incidents involving the McDonnell Douglas MD-11
Aviation accidents and incidents in Saudi Arabia
July 2010 events in Asia
2010 disasters in Saudi Arabia